O'Day is a prominent lunar impact crater that is located on the far side of the Moon. It intrudes into the northwestern edge of Mare Ingenii, and the rim is lower on that side. To the northwest is the crater pair of Holetschek and Sierpinski. Southwest of O'Day lies the crater Seidel. It is named in honour of the American physicist Marcus O'Day.

The crater rim of O'Day remains sharp-edged, and the inner wall is terraced, especially in the northwestern half away from the mare. A small crater lies across the southern rim, and a tiny craterlet is located in the low inner rim between the crater and the mare. The floor is rough and irregular, with a double-peak at the midpoint.

Due to its prominent rays, O'Day is mapped as part of the Copernican System.

Satellite craters

By convention these features are identified on lunar maps by placing the letter on the side of the crater midpoint that is closest to O'Day.

External links
 Lunar Map 103, showing O'Day and surroundings (Regional maps at the Lunar and Planetary Institute.)

References

 
 
 
 
 
 
 
 
 
 
 
 

Impact craters on the Moon